Che, Cha or Chu (Ч ч; italics: Ч ч) is a letter of the Cyrillic script.

In linguistics, it is transcribed as  so "Tchaikovsky" (Чайковский in Russian) may be transcribed as Chaykovskiy or Čajkovskij.

History

In the Cyrillic numeral system, Che had a value of 90.

Usage

Slavic languages
In all Slavic languages that use the Cyrillic alphabet, except Russian, Che represents the voiceless postalveolar affricate .

In Russian, Che usually represents the voiceless alveolo-palatal affricate , like the Mandarin pronunciation of j in pinyin.

In Russian, in a few words, it represents  (like English   in "shape"): .

In China
The 1955 version of Hanyu pinyin contained the Che for the sound [tɕ] (for which later the letter j was used), apparently because of its similarity to the Bopomofo letterㄐ.

The Latin Zhuang alphabet used a modified Hindu-Arabic numeral 4, strongly resembling Che, from 1957 to 1986 to represent the fourth (falling) tone. In 1986, it was replaced by the Latin letter X.

Related letters and other similar characters
4 : 4 - Number that very closely resembles Che, especially in digital or open ended form
C c : Latin letter C - the same sound in Malay, Indonesian, Italian
Č č : Latin letter C with caron 
Ç ç : Latin letter C with cedilla - an Albanian. Azerbaijani, Kurdish, Turkish, and Turkmen letter
Ĉ ĉ : Latin letter C with circumflex, used in Esperanto language
Tx : Digraph Tx, used in Basque and Catalan.
Ch : Digraph Ch
Cs : Digraph Cs
Cz : Digraph Cz
Ҷ ҷ : Cyrillic letter Che with descender
Ӵ ӵ : Cyrillic letter Che with diaeresis
Ҹ ҹ : Cyrillic letter Che with vertical stroke
Ꚇ ꚇ : Cyrillic letter Cche
Ɥ ɥ : Latin letter turned H
Վ վ : Armenian letter Vev
Կ կ : Armenian letter Ken

Computing codes

References

Explanatory footnotes 
  In some varieties of Western Cyrillic, Ҁ was used for 90, and Ч was used for 60 instead of Ѯ.

Citations

External links